The Hart 1035 is a four-stroke, naturally aspirated, 3.5-litre, V10 racing engine, designed, developed and tuned by Brian Hart of Hart Racing Engines, between 1993 and 1994. It produced , and was used solely by the Jordan team.

This culminated in a successful 1994 season, with Rubens Barrichello finishing third at the Pacific Grand Prix and taking the engine company's last F1 pole position at the Belgian Grand Prix.

Applications
Jordan 193
Jordan 194

References

V10 engines
Formula One engines